Louis Keouli Thompson (April 22, 1882 – July 15, 1937) better known by his stage name Segis Luvaun, was a Hawaiian singer and musician and the reported King of Ukulele Players. Thompson, native to Hawai'i, claimed United States citizenship when Hawaii was annexed by the United States as a territory in 1898. He performed much of his life, first touring the United States and later throughout Scandinavia and Europe, many times for Royalty.

Personal life
Louis Thompson was born in Honolulu in the Kingdom of Hawaii in 1882. The earliest known record of him is the 1900 census showing him as a 17-year-old student at the Kamehameha School, then known as the Kamehameha School for Boys. Indeed, Thompson is shown in the schools Class of 1900 class photo. The 1900 census shows both his parents being from the Hawaiian Islands. A 1919 Visa application, filled out by Thompson, records his father's name as Keouli Tawmsen and a 1916 Visa application indicated that his father was deceased at that time. However, on the marriage license to Eveline Walters (shown below), indicates his father's name is 'Carlo Luvaun'. No other information is known of his family.

Thompson married Mildred Elnora Rupp on July 26, 1910 in Chicago, Illinois. At the time, Thompson went by Lu, with his full name on the marriage license recorded as Lu Kaoly Thompson. Rupp was born on October 26, 1893 in Winfield, Kansas. Although Thompson was actually 28 and Rupp was 17 at the time, the marriage license shows them as 26 and 21, respectively. He and Rupp had one child, Billven Keouli Thompson, born December 16, 1911 in Topeka, Kansas. Billven is Thompson's only known child.

Sometime after marrying Rupp in 1910 and before leaving for Europe in 1914, Thompson married Moana. Although little is known about Moana, including her maidian name, one might speculate that she was the inspiration behind Thompson's chart 'Moana Waltz'.

Thompson married Eveline Walters on April 7, 1917 in St. Giles, London, England. At this time, Thompson was 35 and Walters was 21. She was born on September 11, 1896 in Somersetshire, England. and her father's name was Gaius Walters

Within three years (1903) of graduating from Kamehameha School for Boys, Thompson had already left his home land of Hawai'i for the main land of the United States. He toured there for ten years before moving to London in 1914. In 1919, he moved to Copenhagen, Denmark. By 1922, he once again moved, this time to Prague, Czechoslovakia. His last known residence in Europe, per Visa applications, was Riga, Latvia. He remained in Europe until September 1936 when he returned to the United States sailing from Marseille to Boston. He died of heart failure in a Pennsylvania hospital, on July 15, 1937.

Career
Much of Thompson's career has been gathered through newspaper ads and articles, as well as mention in books about the Hawaiian music movement at the time. According to Kamehameha School archives, Thompson had left for the United States main land by 1902 or 1903. Several articles show him touring in the United States as early as 1907 and as late as 1913. In his book How to Play the Ukulele, Thompson records that he was discovered in 1912 while touring in the United States by Sir Walter de Freece, who brought him to Europe. Tracking his travels through passport and visa applications, shows that he lived and performed in locations such as London, Oslo, Copenhagen, the Netherlands, Germany and Switzerland from 1914 to 1931.

United States Tour (1902–1913)
Thompson was manager of a troupe called the Honolulu Students that he toured with across various venues within the United States. The stage name that he used while with the Honolulu Students is Professor Lu Thompson Keouli. During 1907 and 1908, Thompson, along with the Honolulu Students toured as part of the Chautauqua circuit

European Tour (1914–1928)

Stage Names
Thompson appears to have been very prolific with his epithet. Although there is no record of why he chose different aliases, he chose both unique names and spellings at different times in his career. Below is a list of names he was known to use.

 Juan Akoni
 L. Thompson
 Lewis Thompson
 Louis K Thompson
 Lu Kaoly Thompson
 Lu Keouli Thompson
 Luvaun
 Luvaun Tawmsen
 San Juan
 Segis Luvaun

Discography

1916 HMV Label (London, England)
Recorded in London, England under the HMV label as Segis Luvaun

1917 Zonophone label (London, England)
Recorded in London, England under the Zonophone label as Juan Akoni

1917 Winner Label (London, England)
Recorded in London, England under the Winner label as Luvaun assisted by Lady Chetwynd

1917 Zonophone Label (London, England)
Recorded in London, England under the Zonophone label as Juan Akoni

1920 Ekophon Label (Saltsjöbaden, Sweden)
Recorded in Saltsjöbaden, Sweden under the Ekophon label as Segis Luvaun

1920–1921 Grammaphon/Polydor Label (Berlin, Germany)
Recorded in Berlin, Germany under the Grammaphon/Polydor label as Segis Luvaun

Early 1921 Grammaphon/Polydor Label (Berlin, Germany)
Recorded in Berlin, Germany under the Grammaphon/Polydor label as Segis Luvaun

Late 1921 Grammaphon/Polydor Label (Berlin, Germany)
Recorded in Berlin, Germany under the Grammaphon/Polydor label as Segis Luvaun

Sept 1924 Grammaphon/Polydor Label (Berlin, Germany)
Recorded in Berlin, Germany under the Grammaphon/Polydor label with Eric Borchard's Jazzband

1923–1926 Deutsche Grammophon Label (Berlin, Germany)
Recorded in Berlin, Germany under the Deutsche Grammophon label with Efim Schachmeister

Mar 1925 Vox Label (Berlin, Germany)
Recorded in Berlin, Germany under Vox label as Segis Luvaun

Late 1925 Vox Label (Berlin, Germany)
Recorded in Berlin, Germany under Vox label with Original Hawaiian Trio (Bruquil, Milissa, San Juan) as San Juan

Sept–Oct 1925 Winner Label (London, England)
Recorded in London, England under Winner label as Segis Luvaun

1925–1926 The Bell Label (London, England)
Recorded in London, England under The Bell label as Unknown

Mar 1928 Grammaphon/Polydor Label (Berlin, Germany)
Recorded in Berlin, Germany under Grammaphon/Polydor label as Segis Luvaun

Apr 1928 Grammaphon/Polydor Label (Berlin, Germany)
Recorded in Berlin, Germany under Grammaphon/Polydor label as Segis Luvaun

Publications
 Book, How to Play the Ukulele, by Luvaun, London, Ascherberg, Hopwood & Crew, Ltd. (1926), [MT645.L9;]
 Sheet Music, Hawaiian Onestep, für Salonorchester, by Segis Luvaun, arr. von B. Bernards; für Pianoforte, arr. von Kurt Lubbe, Lepizig Publishing House, Germany, c 1919–1923.
 Sheet Music, Moana. Hawaiian Waltz, by Luvaun. Amsterdam Frederiksplein, Louis Noiret Music Publishing Company. 1922.

Notes

References
 Luvaun, How to Play the Ukulele, London, Ascherberg, Hopwood & Crew, Ltd. (1926), [MT645.L9;]
 The Hawaiian Gazette, March 2, 1909, "Hawaiian Singers in the Empire State", Honolulu, Hawaii, pg. 7.
 The Segis Luvaun Bio-Discography, Rainer E. Lotz, Rugby/England, The International Talking Machine Review, 77, Spring 1990, pp. 2255–2259.

1882 births
1937 deaths
Kamehameha Schools alumni
Hawaiian ukulele players
Hawaiian music
Native Hawaiian musicians
Songwriters from Hawaii
Musicians from Hawaii
Hawaiian Kingdom people